Sugar Bush may refer to the following place in the U.S state of Wisconsin:
Sugar Bush, Brown County, Wisconsin, an unincorporated community
Sugar Bush, Outagamie County, Wisconsin, an unincorporated community